Aleksei Ivanovich Selin (born 6 February 1978) is a former Russian professional football player.

Club career
He played 6 seasons in the Russian Football National League for FC Kuban Krasnodar, FC Chernomorets Novorossiysk and FC Nosta Novotroitsk.

References

External links
 

1978 births
People from Korenovsky District
Living people
Russian footballers
Association football midfielders
FC Kuban Krasnodar players
FC Chernomorets Novorossiysk players
FC Rotor Volgograd players
FC Nosta Novotroitsk players
Sportspeople from Krasnodar Krai